"Alone Again (Naturally)" is a song by Irish singer-songwriter Gilbert O'Sullivan. It was recorded in 1972 at the same time as his album Back to Front and was a worldwide hit.

The single spent six non-consecutive weeks at number one on Billboard's Hot 100 between late July and early September 1972 in America. It ranked number two in the year-end chart (behind Roberta Flack's "The First Time Ever I Saw Your Face") and sold more than two million copies.

The song was involved in a 1991 court case which held that sampling of music can constitute copyright infringement.

Lyrics
"Alone Again (Naturally)" is a melancholy, introspective ballad. In the first verse, the singer contemplates suicide after having been left "in the lurch at a church"; in the second, he wonders if there is a God; finally, he laments the death of his parents. O'Sullivan has said the song is not autobiographical: for example, his mother was alive during its composition, and he was not close to his father, who was cruel to his mother and died when the singer was 11 years old.

Reception 
The song received extensive radio airplay in the months after its release, and was critically praised. O'Sullivan commented that “Neil Diamond covered 'Alone Again (Naturally)' and said he couldn't believe a 21-year-old wrote it, but for me it was just one song I had written.” Neil Sedaka stating when he covered the song in 2020 that he wished that he himself had written the song, because its complexity was more typical of someone much older than 21.

Chart performance 

Between late July and early September 1972 in America the single spent six non-consecutive weeks at number one on Billboard's Hot 100 – interrupted by Three Dog Night's "Black and White" – and ranked no. 2 in the year-end chart (behind Roberta Flack's "The First Time Ever I Saw Your Face"). Both O'Sullivan's and Flack's singles spent six weeks at number one, 11 weeks in the Top Ten, 15 weeks in the Top 40 and 18 weeks on the Hot 100. In a decade-end survey as counted down on syndicated radio show Casey Kasem's American Top 40, using Billboard statistics, "Alone Again (Naturally)" ranked five, with Debby Boone's "You Light Up My Life" at number one. It also spent six weeks at number one on Billboard'''s Easy Listening chart. In April 1972 "Alone Again" peaked at no. 3 on the UK singles chart. 

Weekly charts

Year-end charts

All-time charts

Copyright lawsuit

Grand Upright Music, Ltd v. Warner Bros. Records Inc. was a copyright case heard in 1991 by the United States District Court for the Southern District of New York. The case pitted O'Sullivan against Biz Markie after the rapper sampled O'Sullivan's song "Alone Again (Naturally)". The court ruled that sampling without permission can be copyright infringement. The judgment changed the hip hop music industry, requiring that music sampling be preapproved by the original copyright owners to avoid a lawsuit.

Notable cover versions

Several artists have covered the song. 

 A recording by Andy Williams was the title track for the U.S. release of his album of cover songs later in 1972.
 Nina Simone, included as a bonus track on the 1988 digital reissue of her 1982 album Fodder on My Wings. Simone's version has rewritten lyrics, and refer to her troubled relationship with her late father
 Lazlo Bane's frontman Chad Fischer, from the 2009 animated film Ice Age: Dawn of the Dinosaurs. Fischer's rewritten lyrics humorously explores the desire of an acorn for the fictional prehistoric squirrel who once chased it.
 Diana Krall released a duet version with Michael Bublé on her 2015 album Wallflower.
 Vulfmon (Jack Stratton, of Vulfpeck) released a version, with vocals by Monica Martin and flute by Hailey Niswanger, for his 2022 album Here We Go Jack''.

References

External links
 

1972 singles
Songs written by Gilbert O'Sullivan
Gilbert O'Sullivan songs
Billboard Hot 100 number-one singles
Cashbox number-one singles
RPM Top Singles number-one singles
Number-one singles in Brazil
Number-one singles in France
Songs about death
Songs about loneliness
Songs about suicide
MAM Records singles
1970s ballads
1971 songs